Cedar Vale High School is in Cedar Vale, Kansas. The school is located at 500 Dora Street, its mascot is a spartan and the school colors are black and gold. The school competes in the South Central Border league.

See also
 List of high schools in Kansas
 List of unified school districts in Kansas

References

Public high schools in Kansas
Chautauqua County, Kansas